Lori Berd is a village in the Lori Province of Armenia, just east of Stepanavan.  It is the site of the medieval fortress "Lori Berd" located on a peninsula along the deep gorge cut by the Dzoraget and Tashir rivers. Lori Berd is situated at an elevation of 1379 m.

Gallery

See also
Loriberd Hydro Power Plant

Nearby towns
Stepanavan

Nearby villages
Bovadzor
Ledjan
Amrakits
Agarak
Hobardzi

References 

Populated places in Lori Province